Duncan Thomson (born October 1934) is a former director of the Scottish National Portrait Gallery and an authority on the art of Allan Ramsay.

References

External links 

 https://books.google.com/books/about/A_History_of_the_Scottish_National_Portr.html?id=heA6twAACAAJ
 https://books.google.com/books?id=VdZLAQAAIAAJ&q=inauthor:%22Duncan+Thomson%22&dq=inauthor:%22Duncan+Thomson%22&hl=en&sa=X&ved=0ahUKEwi7qd_r9vXZAhUEqlQKHVnCBrUQ6AEIJTAA

Directors of museums in the United Kingdom
Living people
1934 births